Old Dad Mountain is a summit, southwest of the Cinder Cone Lava Beds, west of the Kelso Mountains, north of Jackass Canyon, northeast of the Devils Playground and east of Soda Lake, in San Bernardino County, California.  Old Dad Mountain was named in humorous contrast to the nearby Old Woman Mountains.

References

External links
 Old Dad Mountain, California from peakbagger.com
  West Mojave Peaks Part 3: Old Dad Mountain from calipidder.com
  Old Dad Mountain and Kelso Dunes in Mojave National Preserve from kathywing.smugmug.com

Mountains of San Bernardino County, California
Mountains of Southern California